Juntos Otra Vez ("Together Again") is the twenty-third studio album by Mexican singer-songwriter Juan Gabriel, released on 29 April 1997. It featured Spanish singer Rocío Dúrcal, with whom Gabriel had previously collaborated. This album became their first number-one set on the Billboard Top Latin Albums. The album was awarded "Regional Mexican Album of the Year" at the 1998 Premio Lo Nuestro Award.

On 24 June 1997, Juan Gabriel & Rocio Dúrcal performed the album as a dance spectacle show in full Mexican costume & dance at the Theater Degollado in Guadalajara, Mexico, which was recorded and converted to DVD by BMG with barcode reference 828766260595 and also featured a performance contribution from Miguel Aceves Mejía and Amalia Mendoza. The concert was accompanied by full orchestra and a mariachi ensemble on stage.

Track listing
All tracks written and composed by Juan Gabriel.

Disc one

Disc two

Chart performance

Certifications and sales

References

Juan Gabriel albums
Rocío Dúrcal albums
Regional Mexican music albums
Spanish-language albums
1997 albums
RCA Records albums
Vocal duet albums